Dickran Mardivos Tevrizian Jr. (born August 4, 1940) is a retired United States district judge of the United States District Court for the Central District of California. Confirmed in 1985, he is the first United States federal judge of Armenian ancestry. He is currently a mediator and arbitrator with JAMS.

Education and career

Born in Los Angeles, California, Dickran "Dicky" Tevrizian received a Bachelor of Science degree in finance from the University of Southern California in 1962 and a Juris Doctor from the USC Gould School of Law in 1965. While at USC, Tevrizian was a member of the Gamma Tau Chapter of the Beta Theta Pi fraternity. In 1994, he was awarded the Oxford Cup, the highest honor a brother of Beta Theta Pi can receive. He was a tax accountant with Arthur Andersen and Company in Los Angeles from 1965 to 1966, and then in private practice in Los Angeles until 1972. He was a judge of the Los Angeles Municipal Court from 1972 to 1978. He was a judge of the California Superior Court in Los Angeles from 1978 to 1982, returning to private practice in Los Angeles from 1982 to 1985, and expanding his practice to Pasadena from 1985 to 1986.

Federal judicial service

On November 7, 1985, Tevrizian was nominated by President Ronald Reagan to a new seat on the United States District Court for the Central District of California created by 98 Stat. 333. He was confirmed by the United States Senate on December 16, 1985, and received his commission the following day. Tevrizian  assumed senior status on August 5, 2005, and retired completely from the bench on April 19, 2007.

Notable cases

Tevrizian sentenced Barry Minkow, the criminal teenage entrepreneur who has since become a Christian minister and anti-fraud detective, to prison in 1987. He also sentenced Jurijus Kadamovas and Iouri Mikhel to death in 2007. The men were foreign nationals who had murdered a total of five people.

Post judicial service

Currently, he is a neutral (mediator and arbitrator) with JAMS, active as of March 2018.

See also
List of first minority male lawyers and judges in the United States

References

Sources

External links
USC Institute of Armenian Studies Gala Honors Federal Judge

1940 births
Living people
American people of Armenian descent
California state court judges
Judges of the United States District Court for the Central District of California
Marshall School of Business alumni
Superior court judges in the United States
United States district court judges appointed by Ronald Reagan
20th-century American judges
USC Gould School of Law alumni